2440 Educatio  is a Florian asteroid from the inner regions of the asteroid belt, approximately  in diameter. The possibly elongated S-type asteroid has an exceptionally long rotation period of 1561 hours and is one of the slowest rotators known to exist. It was discovered on 7 November 1978, by American astronomers Eleanor Helin and Schelte Bus at the Palomar Observatory in California, and later named "Educatio", the Latin word for Education.

Orbit and classification 

Educatio member of the Flora family, a giant asteroid family and the largest family of stony asteroids in the main-belt. It orbits the Sun in the inner main-belt at a distance of 1.9–2.6 AU once every 3 years and 4 months (1,205 days; semi-major axis of 2.22 AU). Its orbit has an eccentricity of 0.16 and an inclination of 4° with respect to the ecliptic.

Naming 

This minor planet was named "Educatio", the Latin word for Education, one of the most important human endeavors, which is foremost to the industrialization of space. The official naming citation was published by the Minor Planet Center on 28 January 1983.

Physical characteristics 

In the SMASS classification, Educatio is a stony S-type asteroid, which agrees with the overall spectral type for members of the Flora family.

Rotation period 

A rotational lightcurve of Educatio, obtained from photometric observations, gave a rotation period of 1561 hours with a high brightness amplitude of 0.80 magnitude, indicative of a non-spherical shape. It belongs to the small group of slow rotators with a period above 1000 hours.

Diameter and albedo 

According to the survey carried out by the NEOWISE mission of NASA's Wide-field Infrared Survey Explorer, Educatio measures 6.59 kilometers in diameter and its surface has an albedo of 0.247, while the Collaborative Asteroid Lightcurve Link an albedo of 0.24 – derived from 8 Flora, the parent body of the Flora family – and calculates a diameter of 6.51 kilometers based on an absolute magnitude of 13.1.

References

External links 
 Lightcurve plot (2440) Educatio, Sugerloaf Mt. / Pravec
 Asteroid Lightcurve Database (LCDB), query form (info )
 Dictionary of Minor Planet Names, Google books
 Discovery Circumstances: Numbered Minor Planets (1)-(5000) – Minor Planet Center
 
 

002440
Discoveries by Eleanor F. Helin
Discoveries by Schelte J. Bus
Named minor planets
002440
19781107